Irish and Proud of It is a 1936 British-Irish comedy film directed by Donovan Pedelty and starring Richard Hayward, Dinah Sheridan and Liam Gaffney. In the film, a popular London-based Irish singer announces one evening how much he would love to go home to his home village in rural Ireland. For a prank, some of his friends take him up on this offer. He is kidnapped and deposited on a wild moor. He returns to the village of his youth, slightly disorientated, and battles an American gangster who has taken control of the settlement.

It was made at Wembley Studios as a quota quickie for release by the British subsidiary of Paramount Pictures.

Cast
 Richard Hayward as Donogh O'Connor 
 Dinah Sheridan as Moira Flaherty 
 Gwenllian Gill as Mary Johnson 
 George Pembroke as Mike Finnegan 
 Liam Gaffney as Sean Casey 
 Herbert Thorpe as Benito Colombo 
 Jimmy Mageean as Old Flaherty

References

Bibliography
 Chibnall, Steve. Quota Quickies: The Birth of the British 'B' Film. British Film Institute, 2007.
 Low, Rachael. Filmmaking in 1930s Britain. George Allen & Unwin, 1985.
 Wood, Linda. British Films, 1927-1939. British Film Institute, 1986.

External links

1936 films
British comedy films
Irish comedy films
1936 comedy films
English-language Irish films
Films shot at Wembley Studios
Films set in Ireland
Films set in London
Films directed by Donovan Pedelty
British black-and-white films
Irish black-and-white films
1930s English-language films
1930s British films